Pavlo Orikhovskyi (born 13 May 1996) is a Ukrainian football midfielder who plays for Kolos Kovalivka.

Career
Orikhovskyi is a product of the BRW-BIK Volodymyr-Volynskyi and FC Dynamo youth sportive schools. His first trainer was Viktor Muntyan.

He spent his career in the Ukrainian Premier League Reserves and in February 2016 was promoted to the main-squad team. Orikhovskyi made his debut in the Ukrainian Premier League for club FC Dynamo Kyiv in a match against FC Karpaty Lviv entraining in the second half-time on 11 March 2016.

References

External links

1996 births
Living people
Ukrainian footballers
FC Dynamo Kyiv players
Association football midfielders
Ukrainian Premier League players
Ukraine youth international footballers
FC Chornomorets Odesa players
FC Arsenal Kyiv players
FC Kolos Kovalivka players
FC Rukh Lviv players
Ukraine under-21 international footballers
Sportspeople from Zhytomyr Oblast